Susan Lee (born 7 June 1966) is an Australian rowing coxswain.  She coxed the women's four to a bronze medal at the 1984 Summer Olympics. It was Australia's first Olympic medal in women's rowing.

References 

 
 

1966 births
Living people
Australian female rowers
Rowers at the 1984 Summer Olympics
Olympic bronze medalists for Australia
Coxswains (rowing)
Olympic medalists in rowing
Medalists at the 1984 Summer Olympics
20th-century Australian women